Nakamun Lake is a lake in Alberta.

References

County of Barrhead No. 11
Nakamun Lake
Lac Ste. Anne County